The Terrorist Screening Center (TSC) is a division of the National Security Branch of the Federal Bureau of Investigation. It is the duty of the TSC to identify suspected or potential terrorists. Though housed within the FBI, the TSC is a multi-agency organization, including representatives from the United States Department of Justice, the United States Department of State, the United States Department of Homeland Security, the United States Department of Defense, the United States Postal Service, and various private contractors. It is located in Vienna, Virginia, near Virginia State Route 123.

Established by presidential directive in the wake of the September 11, 2001 attacks, the TSC's funding and manpower have significantly increased since that time.

Duties
The Terrorist Screening Center maintains a database, the Terrorist Screening Database (TSDB), the aim of which is to contain information about all known or suspected terrorists, and makes this information available to a number of different government agencies, including the federal, state, local and tribal law enforcement agencies, the U.S. State Department, U.S. Citizenship and Immigration Services and the Transportation Security Administration.

Leadership
The Terrorist Screening Center is headed by a director, who reports to the executive assistant director of the FBI National Security Branch. The current director is Charles H. Kable, IV.

Organization
The Terrorist Screening Center has three branches:
 Information Technology Branch – oversees IT planning and systems architecture, including the design, maintenance, and modification of the TSDB that houses the consolidated watch list information
 Administration Branch – handles personnel matters, security and guard services, budgetary issues, and logistics and physical space
 Operations Branch – houses the TSC's 24-hour, 7-day a week call center, handling inquiries, complaints, and comments from law enforcement
 Nominations Group – responsible for additions, deletions, and modifications to the consolidated watch list.
 Tactical Analysis Group – performs analysis on encounters with potential terrorists to identify usable intelligence and forwards the information to the necessary parties

See also
No-fly list
Selectee list
Presidential directive

References

External links 
 
 The Terrorist Screening Center homepage
 EPIC Comments on the Terrorist Screening Records System

Federal Bureau of Investigation
Counterterrorism in the United States
2010s establishments in the United States